Costelloe may refer to:

Casla, English name Costelloe, a village in western County Galway, Ireland

People
John Costelloe (politician) (born c. 1900), Irish politician, member of Seanad Éireann from 1963 to 1965
John Costelloe (actor) (1961–2008), American actor
Noel Costelloe (fl. 2011), Irish hurling player
Paul Costelloe (born 1945), Irish fashion designer
Timothy Costelloe (been 1954), Australian metropolitan bishop

See also 
Costello (disambiguation)
Costello (surname)